Matt Dumontelle (born November 28, 1984) is a Canadian curler.

He is a 2013 Tim Hortons Brier champion.

When his team with skip Brad Jacobs won silver medals on 2013 World Men's Curling Championship, Matt Dumontelle was tested positive for the banned substance methandienone, an anabolic steroid, in a test following the world gold-medal game and he was disqualified on 2 years, this sanction ends on May 6, 2015. Until then he was ineligible to participate in any sport that is part of the Canadian Anti-Doping Program.

Teams

References

External links

Matt Dumontelle – Curling Canada Stats Archive

Living people
1984 births
Canadian male curlers
Curlers from Northern Ontario
Sportspeople from Sault Ste. Marie, Ontario
Brier champions
Canadian sportspeople in doping cases
Doping cases in curling
People stripped of awards